The Martin M-130 was a commercial flying boat designed and built in 1935 by the Glenn L. Martin Company in Baltimore, Maryland, for Pan American Airways. Three were built: the China Clipper, the Philippine Clipper and the Hawaii Clipper. All three had crashed by 1945. A similar flying boat, (the Martin 156), named Russian Clipper, built for the Soviet Union, had a larger wing (giving it greater range) and twin vertical stabilizers.

Martin named them the Martin Ocean Transports, but to the public they were the "China Clippers", a name that became a generic term for Pan Am's large flying boats - including, retroactively, the smaller Sikorsky S-42 (first flown in 1931) and larger Boeing 314 (first flown in 1938).

Operational history

Designed to meet Pan American World Airways President Juan Trippe's desire for a trans-Pacific aircraft, the M-130 was an all-metal flying boat with streamlined aerodynamics and engines powerful enough to meet Pan Am's specified range and payload. They were sold at US$417,000. The first flight was on December 30, 1934. On November 22, 1935, the China Clipper, piloted by Captain Edwin C. Musick and First Officer R.O.D. Sullivan, flew the first trans-Pacific airmail route. A postage stamp, Scott Catalog C-20, was printed for use on the transpacific service. With extended service, two more denominations were later issued. All three have the same design showing the M-130 in flight.

Weekly passenger flights across the Pacific Ocean began in October 1936 when Hawaii Clipper left San Francisco for Manila, stopping overnight at Honolulu, Midway Island, Wake Island and Guam. An S-42 began flying the Manila-Hong Kong route in 1937, and the Martins replaced it in 1938.

In July 1938, Hawaii Clipper disappeared between Guam and Manila with the loss of nine crew and six passengers. No cause was determined.

Their range and capacity made them valuable for trans-ocean military flights during World War II. Beginning in 1942, the two remaining planes were pressed into transport roles for the United States Navy. 

The Philippine Clipper was on a civilian flight when it encountered – and survived – the surprise Japanese attack on Wake Island in December 1941, following the attack on Pearl Harbor. It crashed in January 1943, between Ukiah and Boonville, California on a flight from Honolulu.
ComSubPac Admiral Robert H. English and 18 others were killed.

In January 1945 the China Clipper left Miami on Pan Am's first scheduled flight to what is now Kinshasa in the Democratic Republic of the Congo. The route went via Brazil before crossing the South Atlantic Ocean, but the last surviving M-130 did not complete the flight. It broke up and sank during landing at Port of Spain, in the West Indies islands of British colonies of Trinidad and Tobago on January 8, killing 23 of those on board.

Specifications (Martin M-130)

See also

References

Bibliography

External links

 Martin M-130 photo gallery at the University of Miami Library 
 "China Clipper is Giant of Pacific Air Fleet" Popular Mechanics, January 1936

M-130
1930s United States airliners
Flying boats
Four-engined tractor aircraft
High-wing aircraft
Pan Am
Aircraft first flown in 1934
Four-engined piston aircraft